is a Japanese voice actress and singer. She is affectionately referred to by her fellow voice actors and fans as "", "","" and "". She is a skilled pianist as she has played the piano since childhood.
She performed "...To You", the opening theme to Piano, and played pianists in the anime Piano and Nodame Cantabile. She is one of the most prolific and well-known voice actresses in Japan. Throughout her career, she has voiced plenty of iconic and famous characters, such as Akari Kamigishi (To Heart), Saber (Fate/stay night), Elie (Rave Master), Melfina (Outlaw Star), Nodame (Nodame Cantabile), Lafiel (Crest of the Stars – Banner of the Stars), Fuu (Samurai Champloo), Leina (Queen's Blade), Aoi Sakuraba (Ai Yori Aoshi), Mahoro (Mahoromatic) and Natsuki Mogi (Initial D).

Filmography

Television animation

1997
You're Under Arrest – Female officer (episode 33)

1998
Outlaw Star – Melfina
B Bidaman Bakugaiden V
Dokkiri Doctor – Hideko Ikeda and Shoku
DT Eightron – Fia
Guardian Angel Getten – Rishu
Initial D – Natsuki Mogi (Natalie Mogi)
Neo Ranga – Aya
Princess Nine – Azuma Yuki
Serial Experiments Lain – Mika Iwakura
Weiß Kreuz – Sayaka

1999
AD Police: To Serve and Protect – Kyoko Miyano
Black Heaven – Rinko
Crayon Shin-chan – Ai Suotome (starting with episode 339)
Crest of the Stars – Lafiel
Great Teacher Onizuka – Nomura Tomoko & Naoko Izumi
Hoshin Engi – Shinyou
I'm Gonna Be An Angel! – Sara
Initial D: The Second Stage – Natsuki Mogi (Natalie Mogi)
Seraphim Call: Kurumi Matsumoto
To Heart – Akari Kamigishi

2000
Argento Soma – Operator
Banner of the Stars – Lafiel
The Candidate for Goddess – Kazuhi Hikura
Ceres, The Celestial Legend – Chidori Kuruma
Gate Keepers – Ruriko Ikusawa
Ghost Stories – Hanako
Mon Colle Knights – Water Angel
NieA 7 – Mayuko Chigasaki

2001
Angel Tales – Turtle Ayumi
Angelic Layer – Kaede Saito
Banner of the Stars II – Lafiel
Comic Party – Akari (cameo)
Gene Shaft – Dolce Saito and Chacha
Great Dangaioh – Manami Mishio
Rave Master – Elie
Mahoromatic – Mahoro Andō
Muteki Ō Tri-Zenon – Kurara
Sister Princess – Chikage
Zoids: New Century Zero – Rinon (Leena) Toros

2002
Ai Yori Aoshi – Aoi Sakuraba
Kanon – Kaori Misaka
Mahoromatic: Something More Beautiful – Mahoro Andō
Petite Princess Yucie – Elmina
Piano – Nomura Miu
Please Teacher! – Koishi Herikawa
RahXephon – Megumi Shito
Sister Princess RePure – Chikage
Tokyo Underground – Jilherts Mesett
Tokyo Mew Mew – Jacqueline

2003
.hack//Legend of the Twilight – Hotaru
Ai Yori Aoshi Enishi – Aoi Sakuraba
Angel Tales 2 – Turtle Ayumi
E's Otherwise – Ruri
Mahoromatic: Summer Special – Mahoro Andō
Please Twins! – Koishi Herikawa
Popotan – Unagi
Scrapped Princess – Winia Chester

2004
Genshiken: Kanako Ohno
Girls Bravo – Miharu Sena Kanaka
Initial D: The Fourth Stage – Natsuki Mogi (Natalie Mogi)
Kannazuki no Miko – Chikane Himemiya
Kujibiki Unbalance – Kasumi Kisaragi
Kurau Phantom Memory – Kurau Amami
Ninin Ga Shinobuden – Kaede
Samurai Champloo – Fuu
This Ugly Yet Beautiful World – Hikari
To Heart: Remember My Memories – Akari Kamigishi, Hikari Kamigishi (ep. 12)

2005
Atashin'chi – Emiko
Banner of the Stars III – Lafiel
Best Student Council – Sayuri Hida
Black Jack – Michiru
Bludgeoning Angel Dokuro-Chan – Shizuki Minakami
Canvas 2 ~Niji Iro no Sketch~ – Anna Housen (episode 10)
Fushigiboshi no Futagohime – Elsa
Gallery Fake – Sara Harifa
Girls Bravo Second Season – Miharu Sena Kanaka
Ginban Kaleidoscope – Tazusa Sakurano
Gunparade Orchestra – Sakaki Rimei
He Is My Master – Takami Sugita
Hell Girl – Misato Urano (episode 5)
Kyo Kara Maoh! – Ondine
Oku-sama wa Joshi Kōsei (My Wife is a High School Girl) – Asami Onohara
Onegai My Melody – Miki's Mother
Petopeto-san – Kanna Maeda
Shakugan no Shana – Kazumi Yoshida
Starship Operators – Rio Mamiya
Strawberry Marshmallow – Matsuri Sakuragi
The King of Braves GaoGaiGar Final – Papillon Noir
The Snow Queen – Gerda
Trinity Blood – Catherina (10 years old)

2006
Angel Heart – Yume
Fate/stay night – Saber/Arturia Pendragon
Fushigiboshi no Futagohime Gyu! – Elsa
.hack//Roots – Wool
Kanon – Kaori Misaka
Kujibiki Unbalance – Kanako Ohno (preview narration)
Lovely Idol – Aya Hiwatari
Sōkō no Strain – Sara Werec/Sara Cruz
Tsubasa: Reservoir Chronicle – Suzuran (episode 33)
xxxHolic – Ran (episode 9)
Yume Tsukai – Tōko Mishima
Zegapain – Shizuno Misaki/Yehl
Zero no Tsukaima – Henrietta

2007
Bludgeoning Angel Dokuro-Chan 2 – Shizuki Minakami
Claymore – Elena
D.Gray-man – Angela/Sophia
Getsumento Heiki Mina – Sumire Nishiha / Mīna Shiwasu
Genshiken 2 – Kanako Ohno
Hitohira – Nono Ichinose
KimiKiss pure rouge – Tomoko Kawada
Shattered Angels – Kaon
Mokke – Shizuru Hibara
Nodame Cantabile – Megumi Noda
Potemayo – Mikan Natsu
Princess Resurrection – Hime
Romeo x Juliet – Emilia
Shion no Ō – Shion Yasuoka
Shining Tears X Wind – Blanc Neige and Clalaclan Philias
Shakugan no Shana Second – Kazumi Yoshida
Shinkyoku Sōkai Polyphonica – Eufinley Tsuge
Sky Girls – Otoha Sakurano
Skull Man – Kiriko Mamiya
Zero no Tsukaima: Futatsuki no Kishi – Henrietta de Tristain
Zombie-Loan – Kōume

2008
Kanokon – Chizuru Minamoto
Shina Dark – Noel D. Buche
To Love Ru – Saki Tenjōin
Zero no Tsukaima: Princesses no Rondo – Henrietta de Tristain
Kyōran Kazoku Nikki – Dr.Eru
Macademi Wasshoi! – Eineus The Vergest
Nodame Cantabile: Paris Chapter – Megumi Noda
Real Drive – Holon
Skip-Beat! – Ruriko Matsunai
Kuroshitsuji – Queen Victoria, Girl (episode 6)
Kemeko Deluxe! – Fumiko Kobayashi
Kiku-chan to Ookami – Kiku-chan

2009
Pandora Hearts – Alice
Tetsuwan Birdy: Decode Season 2 – Shouko
Maria-sama ga Miteru – Yuuko Hosokawa
The Tower of Druaga: The Sword of Uruk – Kirie
Hayate no Gotoku 2nd Season – Athena Tennōsu
Shinkyoku Sōkai Polyphonica Crimson S – Eufinley Tsuge
07 Ghost – Sister Atena
Queen's Blade – Leina
Pocket Monsters: Diamond and Pearl – Urara
A Certain Magical Index – Laura Stuart
Fight Ippatsu! Jūden-chan!! – Reika Galvani
Battle Spirits: Shōnen Gekiha Dan – Mai Viole
Hatsukoi Limited – Sumire Fudounomiya
Kuroshitsuji – Queen Victoria
Tatakau Shisho – Siron

2010
Cobra the Animation – Ellis
Nodame Cantabile: Finale – Nodame
Ladies versus Butlers! – Tomomi Saikyo
The Qwaser of Stigmata – Miyuri Tsujidō
Fate/stay night: Unlimited Blade Works (2010 film) – Saber/Artoria Pendragon
Gintama – Gedomaru
Maid Sama! – Ayuzawa Minako
Senkou no Night Raid – Shizune Yusa
Bakuman – Kō Aoki/Yuriko Aoki
Okami-san and her Seven Companions – Otsū Tsurugaya
Motto To Love Ru – Saki Tenjōin
Shinryaku!? Ika Musume – Ayumi Tokita
A Certain Magical Index II – Laura Stuart

2011
Bakuman 2 – Kō Aoki/Yuriko Aoki
Gosick – Anastasia
Fate/Zero – Saber
Aria the Scarlet Ammo – Jeanne d'Arc
Fairy Tail – Marl
Ro-Kyu-Bu! – Hatsue Nobidome
Shakugan no Shana III Final – Kazumi Yoshida

2012
Familiar of Zero: F – Henrietta de Tristain
AKB0048 – Sayaka Akimoto The 10th / Akira Igarashi
Fate/Zero 2nd Season – Saber
Accel World – Blood Leopard
Girls und Panzer – Kay
Tari Tari – Haruka Tanaka
JoJo's Bizarre Adventure – Erina Pendleton
To Love Ru Darkness – Saki Tenjōin
Bakuman 3 – Kō Aoki/Yuriko Aoki
The Pet Girl of Sakurasou – Rita Ainsworth

2013
AKB0048 Next Stage – Sayaka Akimoto The 10th / Akira Igarashi
Hayate the Combat Butler: Cuties – Athena Tennōsu (ver. Alice)
Fate/kaleid liner Prisma Illya – Saber Alter
Beyond the Boundary – Izumi Nase
Unbreakable Machine-Doll – Avril

2014
Amagi Brilliant Park – Moffle
Fate/stay night: Unlimited Blade Works – Saber
Dai-Shogun - Great Revolution – Kiriko Hitoribe
Monthly Girls' Nozaki-kun - Yukari Miyako
Ping Pong the Animation – Yurie
Selector Infected WIXOSS – Hanayo
Sword Art Online II – Aki Natsuki
Terra Formars – Nanao Akita
Witch Craft Works – Komachi Takamiya

2015
Assassination Classroom – Aguri Yukimura
Death Parade – Machiko
Kantai Collection – Ōyodo
Fate/stay night: Unlimited Blade Works S2 – Saber
Food Wars: Shokugeki no Soma – Fuyumi Mizuhara
To Love Ru Darkness 2nd – Saki Tenjōin
Seraph of the End: Battle in Nagoya – Aoi Sangu

2016
Maho Girls PreCure! – Loretta
Assassination Classroom 2nd Season – Aguri Yukimura
Keijo – Maya Sakashiro

2017
Is It Wrong to Try to Pick Up Girls in a Dungeon?: Sword Oratoria – Riveria Ljos AlfYu-Gi-Oh! VRAINS – AquaFate/Apocrypha – King Arthur (Episode 6)18if – Eve

2018
 Katana Maidens ~ Toji No Miko – Akane Origami
 Laid-Back Camp – Tea girl
 Violet Evergarden – Clara Magnolia
 Lostorage incited WIXOSS – Hanayo
 Cells at Work! – Mast Cell
 A Certain Magical Index III – Laura Stuart

2019
 Star Twinkle PreCure – Taurus' Star Princess
 The Case Files of Lord El-Melloi II: Grace Note Rail Zeppelin – King Arthur's voice (episode 12, uncredited)
 Fate/Grand Order - Absolute Demonic Front: Babylonia – Fou
 We Never Learn – Hanae Yuiga

2020
 The Misfit of Demon King Academy - Sheila

2021
 That Time I Got Reincarnated as a Slime – Beretta

2022
 Play It Cool, Guys – Shirakawa

Original video animation (OVA)Hamtaro (xxxx).hack//G.U. (xxxx) – AtoliNakoruru ~Ano Hito kara no Okurimono~ (xxxx) – ManariBludgeoning Angel Dokuro-Chan (xxxx) – Shizuki MinakamiThe King of Braves GaoGaiGar Final OVA (xxxx) – Papillon NoirOne: Kagayaku Kisetsu e (xxxx) – Mizuka NagamoriAir Gear: Kuro no Hane to Nemuri No Mori (xxxx) – SimcaSorcerer on the Rocks (xxxx) – Taru-HoStarlight Scramble Ren'ai Kohosei (xxxx) – MegumiBe Rockin'  (xxxx) – KaoriCarnival Phantasm (xxxx) – SaberTournament of the Gods (1997) – Shizuku-himeKai Toh Ran Ma: The Animation (1999) – MayuraAngel Sanctuary (2000) – Sara MudoGuardian Angel Getten OVA (2000)Gundam Evolve (2001) – Red SnakeUsagi-chan de Cue (2001) – MikuTristia of the Deep-Blue Sea (2004) – Nanoca FlankaBanner of the Stars III (2005) – LafielShakugan no Shana Special (2006) – Kazumi YoshidaSky Girls OVA (2006) – Otoha SakuranoDai Mahō Tōge (2006) – AnegoStrawberry Marshmallow OVA (2007) – Matsuri SakuragiTo Love Ru (2009) – Saki TenjōinZettai Junpaku: Mahō Shōjo (2012) – Erika KuramotoThe Kubikiri Cycle (2016) – Kanami IbukiFate/Grand Order: First Order (2017) – Fou, Saber Alter

WebAzumanga Daioh (xxxx) – Ayumu Kasuga a.k.a. Osaka

Film
 Crayon Shin-chan: Rumble in the Jungle (?) – Ai Suotome
 Ah! My Goddess: The Movie (2000) – Morgan le Fay
 Sin: The Movie (2000) – Elise Stewart
 Initial D Third Stage (2001) – Natsuki Mogi
 Pokémon: Jirachi—Wish Maker (2003) – Jirachi
 Brave Story (2006) – Mysterious girl
 Kino's Journey: Country of Illness -For You- (2007) – Inertia
 Shakugan no Shana movie (2007) – Kazumi Yoshida
 King of Thorn (2010) – Laura Owen
 Fate/stay night: Unlimited Blade Works (2010) – Saber
 Strike Witches: The Movie (2012) – Heinrike Prinzessin zu Sayn-Wittgenstein
 Fate/stay night: Heaven's Feel (2017–2020) – Saber
 A Whisker Away (2020) – Kaoru Mizutani
 Fate/Grand Order: Camelot - Wandering; Agaterám (2020–2021) – Lion King
 Fate/Grand Order Final Singularity - Grand Temple of Time: Solomon (2021) – Fou

Video games.hack//G.U. – AtoliAitakute... Your Smiles in My Heart – Senna NinomiyaAnother Eden – AzamiAsobi ni Iku Yo! -Chikyu Pinch no Konyaku Sengen- – ErisuAssassin's Creed: Brotherhood – Lucrezia BorgiaBaldr Force EXE – Tsukina SasagiriBlue Dragon – KlukeCookie Run: Kingdom - Blackberry CookieCounter:Side - Hayami SanaeCrayon Shin-chan: Kids Station! – Ai SuotomeCross Tantei Monogatari – Sato HirokawachieEhrgeiz – Yoko KishibojinEternal City - KachigoFatal Frame 2 – Mayu AmakuraFate/Extella Link – Saber/Artoria PendragonForever Kingdom – FaeanaFuture GPX Cyber Formula: A New Challenger – Rena YuukiFuture GPX Cyber Formula: Road to the Infinity series – Rena YuukiGatekeepers 1970 – Ruriko IkusawaGoemon: Shin Sedai Shuumei – EbisuGokujō Seitokai – Sayuri HidaKikou Heidan J-Phoenix II – RisaIchigo Mashimaro – Matsuri SakuragiInitial D Special Stage – Natsuki MogiMagnaCarta II – RueMana Khemia: Alchemists of Al-Revis – Isolde SchellingMana Khemia 2: Ochita Gakuen to Renkinjutsushi-tachi – Ulrika MybergMuramasa: The Demon Blade – TorahimeNeosphere of the Deep-Blue Sky – Nanoca FlankaOdin Sphere – GwendolynOne: Kagayaku Kisetsu e – Yukimi MiyamiOnly You - Re cross – AkidukiOni – ShinatamaPhantasy Star Universe – Lou, Lumia Waber (Japanese Version)Piece of Wonder – Amane SaionjiPrincess Maker 4 – Rize DorbasShikigami no Shiro III – Yuuki SayoShining Blade – IraSNOW – Sumino YukidukiTales of Legendia – Grune, SchwartzTrauma Center: Second Opinion – Angie Thompson/BlackwellTristia of the Deep-Blue Sea – Nanoca FlankaUmineko no Naku Koro ni – Lion UshiromiyaValkyrie Profile 2: Silmeria – SilmeriaWild Arms: The 4th Detonator – Yulie AhtreideWrestle Angels: Survivor – Chigusa YuukiYou That Become A Memory ~Memories Off~ – Isago Narumi

1997
 To Heart – Akari Kamigishi

1999Kita e: White Illumination – Hayaka Sakyou

2000
 Gensou no Artemis – Mikoto Kunisu
 The King of Fighters 2000 – Hinako Shijou

2001
 Sister Princess – Chikage

2003
 Angelic Vale – Lician, Supica
 Mahoromatic Moetto Kirakira Maid-san – Mahoro

2005
 Namco × Capcom – Sabinu, Wonder Momo
 Love Doll ~Lovely Idol~ – Aya
 Dead or Alive 4 – Kokoro

2006
 Dead or Alive Xtreme 2 – Kokoro

2007
 Dragon Shadow Spell – Miriam
 Fate/stay night – Saber (Arturia Pendragon)
 Fate/tiger colosseum – Saber (Aruturia Pendragon)
 Shining Wind – Kurarakuran
 KimiKiss – Tomoko Kawada

2008
 Fate/tiger colosseum Upper – Saber, Saber Alter
 Fate/unlimited codes – Saber, Saber Lily and Saber Alter
 Rune Factory 2: A Fantasy Harvest Moon – Julia

2010
 Dead or Alive: Paradise – Kokoro
 League of Legends – Leona

2011
 Dead or Alive: Dimensions – Kokoro

2012
 Dead or Alive 5 – Kokoro

 2013 

 Kantai Collection – Isokaze, Ōyodo, Unryū, Chūkan Seiki

2014
 Super Heroine Chronicle – Jeanne d'Arc
 Granblue Fantasy – Lecia, Athena

2015Fate/Grand Order – Saber/Artoria Pendragon, and Anne Bonny (uncredited)
 
 Luminous Arc Infinity – Libra
 Project X Zone 2 – Ati

2016Summon Night 6 – AtiDead or Alive Xtreme 3 – KokoroGirls' Frontline – P99

2017Xenoblade Chronicles 2 – TheoryAzur Lane – King George V

2018Sdorica – Sione AldricFood Fantasy – Vodka, Ume Ochazuke, CaneleDragalia Lost – Eleonora, MaloraPrincess Connect Re:Dive – Jun Shirogane

2019Dead or Alive 6 – KokoroThe King of Fighters All Star – Hinako Shijou

 2020 

 Arknights – Siege
 Genshin Impact – Shenhe
 Punishing: Gray Raven – Bianca

 2022 Goddess of Victory: Nikke – Sugar

Dubbing rolesFabricated City – Yeo-wool (Shim Eun-kyung)Genius – Young Elsa Einstein (Gwendolyn Ellis)Train to Busan – Runaway Girl (Shim Eun-kyung)

Drama CDAngel Sanctuary – Mudo SaraStrobe Edge – Kinoshita NinakoHaru Natsu Aki Fuyu – Natsuki MatsuzakaFate/Zero – Saber Book Girl and the Famished Spirit – Amemiya HotaruKOHA✩TALK – Blue SaberAzmaria Hendrick – Chrno CrusadeFushigi Yūgi Genbu Kaiden'' – Oracle Anlu

Discography

Albums

Singles

Character albums

Character Singles

References

Notes

Citations 

ANN interview on July 23, 2015

External links

Official agency profile 
Ayako Kawasumi at GamePlaza Haruka Voice Artist Database 

Ayako Kawasumi at Ryu's Seiyuu Info

1976 births
Living people
Japanese video game actresses
Japanese voice actresses
Singers from Tokyo
Voice actresses from Tokyo
20th-century Japanese actresses
21st-century Japanese actresses
21st-century Japanese singers
21st-century Japanese women singers